Capesize ships are the largest dry cargo ships with ball mark dimension: about 170,000 DWT (deadweight tonnage) capacity, 290 m long, 45 m beam (wide), 18m draught (under water depth).  They are too large to transit the Suez Canal (Suezmax limits) or Panama Canal (Neopanamax limits), and so have to pass either Cape Agulhas or Cape Horn to traverse between oceans.

When the Suez Canal was deepened in 2009, it became possible for some capesize ships to transit the Canal and so change categories.

Routes 
Major capesize bulk trade routes include: Brazil to China, Australia to China, South Africa to China and South Africa to Europe.

Classification 

Ships in this class are bulk carriers, usually transporting coal, ore and other commodity raw materials. The term capesize is not applied to tankers. The large dimensions and deep drafts of such vessels mean that only the largest deep-water terminals can accommodate them.

Subcategories of capesize vessels include very large ore carriers (VLOC) and very large bulk carriers (VLBC) of above 200,000 DWT. These vessels are mainly designed to carry iron ore.

See also 
 Cape Route
 List of Panamax ports
 Cargo ship size categories
 Suezmax

References

External links 
Ship sizes

Ship types
Ship measurements